Central Brooklyn consists of several neighborhoods often grouped together because of their large populations of African Americans and Caribbean Americans. Central Brooklyn is the largest collection of black communities in both New York City and the United States. These neighborhoods include:

 Bedford-Stuyvesant, which broadly includes smaller communities such as
 Ocean Hill
 Stuyvesant Heights
 Crown Heights, which includes smaller communities such as 
 Weeksville
 East Flatbush, which may be grouped together with the smaller neighborhood of Wingate
 Flatbush, which broadly includes smaller communities such as 
 Ditmas Park
 Prospect Lefferts Gardens
 Prospect Park South

Other communities that may be included in a broader definition of Central Brooklyn are:

 Brownsville
 Canarsie
 Clinton Hill
 East New York
 Fort Greene
 Prospect Heights

Central Brooklyn is centered in the following zip codes:

 11203
 11213
 11216
 11221
 11225
 11226
 11233
 11238
 11233

References

Neighborhoods in Brooklyn
Brooklyn-related lists
Lists of populated places in New York (state)